This article lists the main modern pentathlon events and their results for 2007.

International modern pentathlon events
 May 13 – 20: 2007 CISM Modern Pentathlon Championships in  Rio de Janeiro
 Individual winners:  Sandris Sika (m) /  Yane Marques (f)
 July 23 & 24: 2007 Pan American Games in  Rio de Janeiro
 Individual winners:  Eli Bremer (m) /  Yane Marques (f)

World modern pentathlon events
 August 14 – 22: 2007 World Modern Pentathlon Championships in  Berlin
 Individual winners:  Viktor Horváth (m) /  Amélie Cazé (f)
 Men's Team Relay winners:  (Eric Walther, Sebastian Dietz, & Steffen Gebhardt)
 Women's Team Relay winners:  (Mhairi Spence, Lindsey Weedon, & Katy Livingston)
 August 27 – September 2: 2007 World Youth "A" and Combined Modern Pentathlon Championships in  Pretoria
 Youth Individual winners:  Yasser Hefny (m) /  Krisztina Cseh (f)
 Youth Men's Team Relay winners:  (Mikalai Hayanouski, Raman Pinchuk, & Artsiom Romankov)
 Youth Women's Team Relay winners:  (Rachael Maume, Kate French, & Freyja Prentice)
 Youth Combined winners:  Maxim Sherstyuk (m) /  Anais Eudes (f)
 September 25 – 30: 2007 World Junior Modern Pentathlon Championships in  Caldas da Rainha
 Junior Individual winners:  Ondřej Polívka (m) /  Adrienn Tóth (f)
 Junior Men's Team Relay winners:  (Pier Paolo Petroni, Riccardo De Luca, & Federico Giancamilli)

Continental modern pentathlon events
 February 22 – 25: 2007 African Modern Pentathlon Championships in  Cairo
 Individual winners:  Amro El Geziry (m) /  Aya Medany (f)
 March 8 – 11: 2007 NORCECA Modern Pentathlon Championships in  Havana
 Individual winners:  Sergio Escalante (m) /  Larissa Lellys (f)
 May 10 – 13: 2007 Asian & Oceania Modern Pentathlon Championships in  Tokyo
 Individual winners:  Lee Choon-huan (m) /  Dong Le'an (f)
 June 6 – 13: 2007 European Modern Pentathlon Championships in  Riga
 Individual winners:  Viktor Horváth (m) /  Evdokia Gretchichnikova (f)
 Team Relay winners:  Aleksei Turkin (m) /  Heather Fell (f)
 July 3 – 8: 2007 European Junior Modern Pentathlon Championships in  Budapest
 Junior Individual winners:  Róbert Kasza (m) /  Adrienn Tóth (f)
 Junior Men's Team Relay winners:  (Szymon Staśkiewicz, Bartosz Majewski, & Michal Kacer)
 Junior Women's Team Relay winners:  (Adrienn Tóth, Krisztina Cseh, & Leila Gyenesei)
 July 4 – 9: 2007 European Youth "B" Modern Pentathlon Championships in  Las Palmas
 Youth Individual winners:  Zaramuk Shabatokov (m) /  Sarolta Kovács (f)
 July 12 – 15: 2007 European Youth "A" & Combined Modern Pentathlon Championships in  Vilnius
 Youth Individual winners:  Maxim Sherstyuk (m) /  Adrienn Tóth (f)
 Youth Men's Team Relay winner:  Bence Demeter
 Youth Women's Team Relay winners:  (Sarolta Kovács, Adrienn Tóth, & Krisztina Cseh)
 Youth Combined winners:  Mikalai Hayanouski (m) /  Ronja Steinborn (f)
 November 22 – 26: 2007 South American Senior & Junior Modern Pentathlon Championships in  Rio de Janeiro
 Senior/Junior Individual winners:  Tzanko Hantov (m) /  Margaux Isaksen (f)

2007 Modern Pentathlon World Cup
 March 2 – 5: MPWC #1 in  Mexico City
 Individual winners:  Marcin Horbacz (m) /  Edita Maloszyc (f)
 March 22 – 25: MPWC #2 in  Cairo
 Individual winners:  Eric Walther (m) /  Tatiana Mouratova (f)
 April 12 – 15: MPWC #3 in  Millfield
 Individual winners:  Gábor Balogh (m) /  Georgina Harland (f)
 May 10 – 13: MPWC #4 for Men in  Budapest
 Individual winner:  Andrey Moiseyev
 May 10 – 13: MPWC #4 for Women in  Moscow
 Individual winner:  Tatiana Mouratova
 May 24 – 27: MPWC #5 for Men in  Drzonków
 Individual winner:  Libor Capalini
 May 24 – 27: MPWC #5 for Women in  Székesfehérvár
 Individual winner:  Zsuzsanna Vörös
 Women's Team Relay winners:  (Lada Jiyenbalanova, Alena Abrossimova, & Arina Jienbalanova)
 June 24 – 30: MPWC #6 in  Rome
 Individual winners:  Libor Capalini (m) /  Anastasiya Prokopenko (f)
 September 15 & 16: MPWC #7 (final) in  Beijing
 Individual winners:  Edvinas Krungolcas (m) /  Aya Medany (f)

References

External links
 Union Internationale de Pentathlon Moderne Website (UIPM)

 
Modern pentathlon
2007 in sports